Theatre 70 is a 70-minute UK dramatic television anthology series produced by Associated Television. Twenty-five episodes aired on ITV from 1960–61. Guest actors included Zoe Caldwell, Robert Horton, André Morell, Georgina Ward and Margaret Whiting.

References

External links

1960 British television series debuts
1961 British television series endings
1960s British anthology television series
Television shows produced by Associated Television (ATV)